This is a list of buildings that are examples of the Art Deco architectural style in Washington, United States.

Bremerton 
 Admiral Theater, Bremerton, 1942
 Pacific Planetarium (former Fire Station No. 1), Bremerton, 1939
 Roxy Theater, Bremerton, 1941

Longview 
 Big Four Furniture Building (former Lumberman's Bank), Longview, 1934
 Pacific Telephone and Telegraph Building, Longview, 1928
 Stageworks Theatre, Longview, 1941

Seattle 
 1411 4th Avenue Building, Seattle, 1928
 Admiral Theater, Seattle, 1919, 1942
 Exchange Building, Seattle, 1929
 Federal Office Building, Seattle, 1932
 Fire Station No. 6, Seattle
 Fire Station No. 41, Seattle, 1936
 Guild 45th Theatre, Seattle, 1919, 1933, 1955
 Hartford Building (now a coffee shop), Seattle
 Jewel Box Theatre, Seattle, 1932
 Macy's (former Bon Marché), Seattle, 1929
 Magnolia Fire Station, Seattle, 1934
 Naval Reserve Armory, Seattle, 1942
 Pacific Tower, Seattle, 1932
 Sanctuary at Admiral, Seattle, 1929
 Schmitz Park Bridge, Seattle, 1936
 Seattle Asian Art Museum, Seattle, 1933
 Seattle Tower (former Northern Life Tower), Seattle, 1927
 SIFF Cinema Uptown (former Uptown Theatre), Seattle, 1926 and 1940s
 United Shopping Tower, Seattle, 1929
 Varsity Theatre, Seattle, 1921
 Washington Athletic Club, Seattle, 1930

Spokane 
 City Ramp Garage, Spokane, 1928
 Felts Field, Spokane, 1932
 Fox Theater, Spokane, 1931
 Garland Theater, Spokane, 1945
 John R. Rogers High School, Spokane, 1932
 Pay'n Takit, Spokane, 1933
 Sears, Roebuck Department Store, Spokane, 1929

Tacoma 
 Fire Station No. 2, Tacoma, 1907
 Fire Station No. 5, Tacoma, 1935
 Tacoma Municipal Building, Tacoma, 1933

Vancouver 
 Clark County Courthouse, Vancouver, 194
 Kiggins Theatre, Vancouver, 1936
 Luepke Florist, Vancouver, 1937, 1945
 Vancouver Telephone Building, Vancouver, 1934

Other cities 
 A. E. Larson Building, Yakima, 1931
 Adams County Courthouse, Ritzville
 Bellingham City Hall, Bellingham, 1939
 Cascadian Hotel, Downtown Wentachee Historic District, Wentachee, 1929
 Chehalis Theatre, Chehalis, 1938
 Collins Building, Colville, 1937
 Covington Electrical Substation, Bonneville Power Administration, Covington, 1941
 D&R Theatre, Aberdeen, 1924 and 1937
 Everett City Hall, Everett, 1920s
 F. W. Woolworth Company Store, Renton, 1954
 Ferry County Courthouse, Republic, 1936
 First American National Bank Building, Port Townsend
 Fox Theatre, Centralia, 1930
 Kelso Theater, Kelso, 1923
 Klickitat County Courthouse, Goldendale, 1942
 Larson Building, Yakima
 Loudon Brothers Dairy Building, Ellensburg, 1930s
 National Bank of Ellensburg (now 420 Loft), Ellensburg, 1937
 New Ritz Theatre, Ritzville, 1937
 North Bend Theatre, North Bend, 1941
 Olympic Theatre, Arlington, 1939
 Omak Cinema, Omak, 1937
 Pacific Telephone Building, Walla Walla, 1936
 Princess Theater, Prosser, 1919 and 1940s
 Renton Theatre, Renton, 1920s
 Ritz Theatre, Ritzville, 1937
 Sacajawea Interpretive Center, Sacajawea State Park, Franklin, 1938
 Thurston County Courthouse, Olympia, 1930
 United States Post Office and Annex, Wenatchee, 1918 and 1938
 United States Post Office Hoquiam Main, Hoquiam, 1932
 United States Post Office Lynden Main, Lynden, 1940

See also 
 List of Art Deco architecture
 List of Art Deco architecture in the United States

References 

 "Art Deco & Streamline Moderne Buildings." Roadside Architecture.com. Retrieved 2019-01-03.
 Cinema Treasures. Retrieved 2022-09-06
 "Court House Lover". Flickr. Retrieved 2022-09-06
 "New Deal Map". The Living New Deal. Retrieved 2020-12-25.
 "SAH Archipedia". Society of Architectural Historians. Retrieved 2021-11-21.
 "USA: Seattle's Art Deco Jewels – from Skyscraper to Fire Station". Minor Sights, November 6, 2017.. Archived from the original on 2019-01-16. Retrieved 2019-01-16.

External links 
 

 
Art Deco
Art Deco architecture in Washington (state)
Washington (state)-related lists